Lucio Luiz (born Rio de Janeiro, July 14, 1978) is a Brazilian journalist, writer, editor, podcaster and comics author. He holds a degree in Journalism and has Master's degree and Doctorate in Education.

Biography

Fan fiction 

From 2002, Lucio started writing fan fiction (mainly about the characters Lobo and Fire, from DC Comics) on the Hyperfan website, then one of the main Brazilian websites dedicated to fanfics. In 2006, already as editor-in-chief of the site, he organized the book Hyperfan: cinco anos de fanfic (Hyperfan: five years of fanfic) in honor of the site's anniversary, which brought unpublished stories created by its members, as well as illustrations by the comics artist JJ Marreiro.

The short stories were set in a new fictional universe, created by the authors, in which ordinary people gain superpowers thanks to a mysterious phenomenon. This book is considered the first Brazilian fiction book dedicated to the superhero genre.

In addition to being responsible for editing and organizing the book, Lucio wrote the humorous short story "Super tia" (Super aunt), about a kindergarten teacher who began to mentally control her students with tragicomic results.

Academic research 

Between 2007 and 2009, Lucio took a Masters in Education at Estácio de Sá University, developing a dissertation on the impact of the creation of fan fiction by teachers and students in relation to school written production and digital literacy. From that time on, he began to regularly publish academic research at various conferences in the areas of Communication and Education, and he was also one of the first Brazilian researchers to study and write academic articles on participatory culture.

At that time, there was not yet a consecrated translation in Brazil for the term "participatory culture", with Lucio suggesting the use of "cultura participatória" as it is closer to the original intention of Henry Jenkins, creator of the term. However, as more research was carried out, the translation "cultura participativa" ended up becoming the most used in Portuguese.

In 2018, Lucio completed his Doctorate in Education at Estácio de Sá University, defending a thesis on the perception of Basic education teachers on the use of comics in the classroom. In 2021, this thesis was published in the book Professores Protagonistas: os quadrinhos em sala de aula na visão dos docentes (Protagonist Teachers: comics in the classroom in the view of educators).

Meninos e Dragões 

In 2012, Lucio created, in co-authorship with artist Flavio Soares, the children's comic book series Meninos & Dragões, which won the 2nd Prêmio Abril de Personagens (Abril Characters Award) and was released as a regular comic book by Editora Abril the following year.

However, due to the crisis that Editora Abril was going through at the time, which was resulting in several cuts in publications, especially comics, the comic book was canceled after the publication of the first issue. Still, the comic won the Prêmio Angelo Agostini for Best Release in 2014.

The series Meninos e Dragões was published again in 2018, when Lucio and Flavio re-released it in the format of albums with unique stories and with the characters' look completely reformulated. The first volume was nominated for the Troféu HQ Mix for Best Children's Publication the following year.

Publishing house 

In 2013, Lucio founded the independent publishing house Marsupial Editora, focused on books in the areas of Education, Communication and Technology. The following year, he created the Jupati Books imprint, intended for the publication of comics, being responsible for editing several collections and graphic novels.

The publisher's first book was Os Quadrinhos na Era Digital: HQtrônicas, webcomics e cultura participativa (Comics in the Digital Age: "comictronics", webcomics and participatory culture), a theoretical book organized by Lucio with texts, among others, by researchers Octavio Aragão, Edgar Franco, Roberto Elísio dos Santos, Henrique Magalhães and Paulo Ramos, in addition to Lucio himself. This book was nominated for the Troféu HQ Mix for Best Theoretical Book in 2014.

In addition, Lucio has also written children's books such as A Mamãe Tamanduá, with illustrations by PriWi, and Palavras, Palabras, with illustrations by Bianca Pinheiro.

Comics 

Lucio created, in 2009, the comic strip As Aventuras do MorsaMan with Flavio Soares. The comic presented short stories of the character MorsaMan, "mascot" of the health and entertainment website Papo de Gordo, in which both participated as podcasters and writers.

In addition to writing the series Meninos e Dragões, Lucio also published comics in collections such as Feitiço da Vila, with stories inspired by the songs of Noel Rosa (he wrote two stories, illustrated respectively by Mario Cau and Lu Cafaggi), and Café Espacial #13, with a story drawn by Flavio Soares, among other works.

In 2020, Lucio was a juror for the Prêmio Jabuti in the “Comic Book" category, alongside Germana Viana and Marcelo D'Salete. The judges were chosen by the award's Board of Curators after a public consultation.

In July 2022, Lucio published on the platform Webtoon the webcomic 4th Wall Brawl, written by him and with pencils by Flávio Luiz, ink by Flavio Soares and colors by Will Rez and Marco Pelandra.

Awards and nominations

References 

Comic book publishers (people)
Comic book editors
1978 births
Living people
Universidade Gama Filho alumni
Brazilian comics creators
Comics scholars
Prêmio Angelo Agostini winners
Brazilian comics writers
Brazilian journalists
Brazilian writers
Podcasters